One is a chamber opera for soprano, video and soundtrack composed in 2002 by Michel van der Aa who also wrote the English-language libretto. It premiered on 12 January 2003 with Barbara Hannigan in the Frascati Theatre, Amsterdam. In 2004 Michel van der Aa received the Matthijs Vermeulen Award for this work.

References

External links
One, video excerpts

Operas by Michel van der Aa
Chamber operas
2003 operas
Operas
English-language operas